This is a List of Mormon place names, meaning towns and other places named, in modern times, after places and people in the Book of Mormon, after Mormon leaders during the settlement of Utah, or after other elements of the Church of Jesus Christ of Latter-day Saints' history.  See List of Book of Mormon places for a reference list of locations mentioned in the Book of Mormon, and List of Book of Mormon people for persons mentioned therein.  The intention is to list all places named (usually by Mormons) for specifically Mormon places and people, where those names are not otherwise generally known as Biblical (meaning from the Old and New Testaments) to non-Mormons.

According to John W. Van Cott in his 1990 work Utah Place Names, the Mormons named more places in Utah than any other group or individual in the state.  Salt Lake City Tribune author Davidson noted, in 2018, that "Utah cities and towns were named for at least five church presidents, 10 apostles, 11 stake presidents, nine bishops, two biblical figures and three Book of Mormon prophets, among other things." Similar general works for other regions, such as Idaho Place Names, identify numerous other Mormon place names.

Place names

The intention is to list all modern usages of place names that are clearly Mormon, to exclusion of other Christian place names. Those starred are from the Book of Mormon, or modern revelation.

Adam-ondi-Ahman*
 Adam-ondi-Ahman, Missouri, in Daviess County, Missouri, was named by Joseph Smith, who asserted it was where Adam, of Adam and Eve had set up an altar, after Adam and Eve had been expelled from the Garden of Eden.  Settlement there was challenged, and Joseph Smith and followers moved on to Far West.

Ammon*
 Ammon, Idaho, originally South Iona, the area was made a ward in the church in 1889 with Arthur M. Rawson as bishop, who renamed the town in honor of Ammon, a figure in the LDS book of scripture, the Book of Mormon.

Ballard
Ballard, Utah in Uintah County, is named after LDS apostle Melvin J. Ballard

Bountiful
Bountiful, Utah, named after Bountiful (Book of Mormon). It was the second city established by Mormons in Utah.

Brigham
Brigham City, Utah, in Box Elder County, named for Brigham Young, second LDS church president.  It was called Youngsville for two years before.
 Brigham City, Arizona, a nearby town is called Joseph City, Arizona

Cannonville
Cannonville, Utah, in Garfield County, "Named for former apostle George Q. Cannon. Has also been called "Gunshot", as locals say "it’s too small for a cannon."

Cardston
 Cardston and Cardston County in Alberta are named for Charles Ora Card, sometimes known as "Canada's Brigham Young".

Clawson
Clawson, Utah, in Emery County, named for apostle Rudger Clawson, who had visited to organize a ward there.

Colonia LeBaron
 Colonia LeBaron was founded by a fundamentalist sect in Chihuahua, Mexico and named after the LeBaron family.

Colonia Mormones
 Colonia Mormones in Sonora, Mexico.

Cumorah*
Cumorah, also known as Mormon Hill, Gold Bible Hill, and Inspiration Point, is a drumlin in Manchester, New York, United States, where Joseph Smith said he found a set of golden plates which he translated into English and published as the Book of Mormon. Cumorah is a name found in the Book of Mormon, and given to the site by early Latter-day Saints. The Sacred Grove is nearby.

Cutler's Park
 Cutler's Park, in what is now Nebraska, was named in honor of Alpheus Cutler, who founded the site. Cutler was an early leader in the  Latter Day Saint movement, who was later known for being one of the master builders of the Nauvoo Temple and for establishing his own branch of Mormonism known as the Church of Jesus Christ (Cutlerite).

Deseret*
State of Deseret, provisional U.S. state which existed for two years
Deseret, Utah, in Millard County
Deseret, California
Deseret (Book of Mormon) is the word for "honeybees" in land of the Jaredites, in the Book of Mormon.  "Brigham Young wanted pioneers to be as industrious as honeybees and used the name in many places and ways. When Latter-day Saints first sought statehood, they applied using the name 'State of Deseret.'"

Draper
Draper, Utah, in Salt Lake County, honors William Draper, the first LDS bishop of the city.

Enoch*
 Enoch, Utah after the Order of Enoch.
 Enoch, Texas, founded by LDS and named after the Order of Enoch. Samuel O. Bennion's organization of the Enoch Branch in 1911. The first Latter-day Saint settlers had arrived in 1906. In 1908 a Sunday School was organized at Enoch. In 1910 a building was built for the Sunday School. In 1930 it was only one of eight communities in Texas where the church owned a chapel.

Ephraim*
 Ephraim, Utah - the special significance here is that the Tribe of Ephraim is said to restore the gospel to the earth and many modern Mormons are said to belong to it.

Far West
Far West, Missouri, in Caldwell County, Missouri, was a Mormon settlement, which grew as Mormons were expelled from the Adam-ondi-Ahman, Missouri area.  Settlement there, too, was challenged, and many Mormons moved on to Nauvoo, Illinois.

Farr West
Farr West, Utah, in Weber County, is named for Lorin Farr, first president of the LDS Weber Stake.  It is also named for bishop Chauncey W. West, and is a nod to Far West, Missouri, an important previous Mormon community.

Fayette
Fayette, Utah, in Sanpete County, is named for Fayette, New York.  In 1830 the LDS Church was organized there.

Fielding
Fielding, Utah, in Box Elder County.  It was named to honor Mary Fielding Smith, mother of the sixth president of the LDS church, Joseph Fielding Smith. "It was named in part to honor the church president, too."  Van Cott says it was named for the mother.

Francis
Francis, Utah, in Summit County, named for apostle Francis M. Lyman, as is Lyman.

Grantsville
Grantsville, Utah in Tooele County, Utah, a city named for George D. Grant, who served as a colonel in the Nauvoo Legion.

Georgetown
Georgetown, Idaho, renamed from "Twin Creeks" by Brigham Young for his friend George Q. Cannon in 1873, after the two had visited the colony together.

Hamblin
 Hamblin, Utah named for Jacob Hamblin

Harmony
New Harmony, Utah, in Washington County, is named for Harmony, Pennsylvania, where Joseph Smith translated the Book of Mormon, "and to signify harmony among early settlers."

Hawkins
Hawkins, Idaho, possibly named after Sister Hawkins, LDS missionary

Heber City
Heber City, Utah, named for apostle Heber C. Kimball. Heber "had baptized many of the city’s early residents as a missionary in England before they immigrated."

Henrieville
Henrieville, Utah, in Garfield County, named for James Henrie, the first LDS stake president in its area.

Hinckley
Hinckley, Utah, in Millard County, named for Ira Hinckley, a stake president in its area, and grandfather of future church president Gordon B. Hinckley)."

Hooper
 Hooper, Utah, named for William Henry Hooper, a member of the Council of Fifty of the Church of Jesus Christ of Latter-day Saints and an early Utah delegate to Congress.

Hyde Park
Hyde Park, Utah, in Cache County, is assertedly named for William Hyde, the first LDS bishop in its area  It may also partly be named for London's Hyde Park.

Hyrum
Hyrum, Utah, in Cache County was named for Hyrum Smith, Joseph Smith's brother.  A twin settlement was intended to be founded nearby and named Joseph, but it never happened.

Iona
Iona, Idaho "Iona: According to the town’s own history book, Iona was named by LDS Church President John Taylor. He visited early settlers in the area, then known as Sand Creek, and apparently suggested the name “Iona”, claiming it was the name of a small town in Israel that meant “beautiful”." It is also the name of an island in Scotland.

Iosepa
Iosepa, Utah, uses the Hawaiian word for "Joseph", and is named for missionary Joseph F. Smith who recruited Polynesians to settle in Skull Valley.  Settlers included Samoans and Māori as well as Native Hawaiians.  It was tough going.  Later when Smith was LDS church president, returns to Hawaii were funded, and the town became a ghost town.

Ivins
Ivins, Utah, in Washington County, is named for apostle Anthony W. Ivins.

Jacob Lake
 Jacob Lake, Arizona, named for Jacob Hamblin

Joseph
Joseph, Utah, in Sevier County "Honors not Joseph Smith but rather Joseph A. Young, the first president of the LDS Sevier Stake."
 Joseph City, Arizona, a nearby town is called Brigham City, Arizona, named after the first two church presidents.

Kaysville
Kaysville, Utah, honors William Kay, the first LDS bishop in its area. Early settlers, including Kay, wanted to name it "Freedom". "But Brigham Young asked, 'When did Bishop Kay’s ward get its freedom?' Young pushed the name Kaysville instead." also

Kimball
 Kimball, Alberta named after the ward which was named after the descendants of Heber C. Kimball.

Kingston
Kingston, Utah, in Piute County, is named for Thomas Rice King, who was a Latter-day Saint bishop who moved from Fillmore to Piute County with his five sons and their families to establish a United Order.

Kirtland
 Kirtland, New Mexico is named for Kirtland, Ohio, where the LDS built one of their first temples and were expelled from.

Kolob*
Kolob Canyons, named for Kolob, "a major star in Mormon cosmology, the center of the Universe"  Kolob is mentioned in Book of Abraham, written by Joseph Smith, part of the Pearl of Great Price.

Lamoni*
 Lamoni, Iowa  named after Lamoni, a king mentioned in the Book of Mormon. Formerly headquarters of the Community of Christ (RLDS)

Layton
Layton, Utah, named for early bishop Christopher Layton.

Leavitt
 Leavitt, Alberta, adjacent to Cardston, was founded by Thomas Rowell Leavitt, another Mormon fleeing the U.S. federal crackdown on polygamy.

Lehi*
Several places are named after Lehi from the Book of Mormon, as opposed to Lehi (Bible) a place in the Old Testament.  Book of Mormon Lehi's include two prophets: Lehi (Book of Mormon prophet), 7th–6th cen. BC or Lehi, son of Helaman, late 1st cen. BC;  and two other persons: Lehi, Nephite military commander, or Lehi, son of Zoram.
Lehi, Arizona, a Mormon agricultural community and neighborhood now part of Mesa, Arizona
Lehi, Utah, "Named for a Book of Mormon prophet. It was chosen because its early pioneers had moved often, much like the scriptural prophet Lehi, who traveled from Jerusalem to the Americas."

Lewiston
Lewiston, Utah in Cache County "Honors an early Latter-day Saint bishop, William H. Lewis, renamed after earlier being called Poverty Flat."

Lund
 Lund, Nevada named for Anthon H. Lund of the Quorum of the Twelve.

Lyman
Lyman, Utah, in Wayne County, named for apostle Francis M. Lyman, as was Francis.

Maeser
Maeser, Utah, in Uintah County, named for Karl G. Maeser, early president of Brigham Young University and head of the LDS church's Sunday school. "He visited the area, and residents liked him so much they named the town in his honor."

Manti*
Manti is the name of a city in the Book of Mormon and also of Manti, a soldier
Manti, Utah, as a new community, was named by Brigham Young after the city mentioned in the Book of Mormon.  "Honors a city mentioned in the Book of Mormon. Originally, Danish settlers there had named it Copenhagen."
Manti National Forest, in Utah and Colorado
Manti, Iowa, was a Mormon settlement which failed, many of whose settlers moved to Shenandoah, Iowa, instead.
Manti Crater on Mars, named for the community in Utah.

Martin's Cove
 Martin's Cove, in what is now Wyoming, is named for the Martin Handcart Company. In November 1856, about 500 Mormon emigrants in the Martin Handcart Company were halted for five days in the Cove by snow and cold while on their way to Salt Lake City. The Martin Handcart company had begun its journey on July 28, 1856, which was dangerously late in the season and would ultimately lead to the disaster. Although the number who died in the Cove is unknown, more than 145 members of the Martin Company died before reaching Salt Lake City.

Milo
Milo, Idaho "Milo: First, there was a small settlement named Leorin, as well as a Leorin School. An LDS ward was organized there in 1900 and called the Milo Ward after Milo Andrus, an LDS pioneer who led a company across the plains to the Intermountain West. It’s probable that the Milo name then just became a common way for Mormons to refer to the area, so it stuck."

Morgan
Morgan County, Utah, named for apostle Jedidiah Morgan Grant, advisor to Joseph Smith and father of church president Heber J. Grant

Mormon*
Mormon is a prophet who gave his name to the Book of Mormon, which in turn produced the nickname of Latter-day Saints.

 Mormon, California
 Mormon Bar, California
 Mormon Bridge, crossing the Missouri River between Nebraska and Iowa, officially named the Mormon Pioneer Bridge
 Mormon Flat, in Arizona northeast of Phoenix, and the associated Mormon Flat Dam
 Mormon Grove near Zodiac, Texas
 Mormon Gulch, now known as Tuttletown, California
 Mormon Island, California
 Mormon Island (Colorado River)
 Mormon Island State Recreation Area, Hall County, Nebraska
 Mormon Lake, Arizona, an intermittent lake named after pioneers. Gives its name to the settlement of Mormon Lake, Arizona.
 Mormon Mill, Burnet County, Texas
 Mormon Mountains, Nevada, including Mormon Peak (Nevada) and the East Mormon Mountains
 Mormon Pioneer National Heritage Area, stretching through six counties of Utah (Garfield, Kane, Piute, Sanpete, Sevier, and Wayne counties)
 Mormon Reservoir (Idaho)
 Mormon Road, trail to California pioneered in 1847, through Utah, Arizona, Nevada and through the Mojave Desert of California to Los Angeles
 Mormon Row, in Jackson Hole valley, Wyoming
 Mormon Springs, Mississippi
 Mormon Station, now known as Genoa, Nevada
 Mormon Tavern, California
 Mormon volcanic field, south of Flagstaff, Arizona
 Mormon Well Spring, Nevada

Moroni*
Moroni, Utah, in Sanpete County, named for Moroni, last prophet in Book of Mormon, "the same man who Joseph Smith said appeared to him as an angel (and is featured in statue form atop many Latter-day Saint temples)."

Mount Pisgah
 Mount Pisgah, Iowa, was named by LDS apostle Parley P. Pratt, who, when he first saw the modest hill, was reminded of the biblical Pisgah (Deuteronomy 3:27) where Moses viewed the Promised Land.

Nauvoo*
The original Nauvoo is in Illinois, named by Joseph Smith and was founded by church members. The name is derived from the traditional Hebrew language with an anglicized spelling. The word comes from Isaiah 52:7, “How beautiful upon the mountains...” 
 Nauvoo, Alabama, Tom Carroll renamed Ingle Mills for Nauvoo, Illinois. 
 Nauvoo, Illinois
 Nauvoo, Tioga County, Pennsylvania
 Nauvoo, York County, Pennsylvania
 Nauvoo, Tennessee

Nephi*
Nephi is the name of two Book of Mormon prophets
Nephi, Utah, named after Nephi, son of Lehi, from the Book of Mormon.  It was previously called "Little Chicago."

Nibley
Nibley, Utah, in Cache County, honors Charles W. Nibley, a past presiding bishop of the LDS Church.

Orderville
Orderville, Utah, in Kane County, named for the United Order, a collectivist movement practiced there by Mormons

Parley
Parley's Canyon and Parley's Summit, named after early apostle Parley P. Pratt.

Perry
Perry, Utah, in Box Elder County, is named for Lorenzo Perry, Perry's first LDS bishop. It was previously named Porter's Spring, after controversial Mormon gunfighter Orrin Porter Rockwell.

Preston
Preston, Idaho "Preston: The settlement was originally called Worm Creek, but renamed in honor of William B. Preston, a prominent LDS Church authority who was an early settler of Cache Valley."

Ramah*
 Ramah, New Mexico named after Cumorah also known as Ramah in the Book of Mormon.

Randolph
Randolph, Utah, in Rich County, Utah, named for early LDS bishop Randolph Stewart

Raymond
 Raymond, Alberta, for Ray Knight named in his honour by his father.

Rich
Rich County, Utah, named for early apostle Charles C. Rich.

Rigby
Rigby, Idaho "Rigby: Your town was named by LDS Church President John Taylor after William F. Rigby, a Driggs resident who had assisted in the settlement and early organization of the LDS Church in the area."

St. George
St. George, Utah, named after apostle George A. Smith  It was "suggested that if other churches could have saints, Mormons could, too."

St James
 St. James Township, Michigan is named for James Strang, who led a faction of Mormon settlers to Beaver Island in 1848 in a rival faction to Brigham Young. called St. James, naming it after himself. Strang led those who accepted him to Nauvoo, Illinois, and then Voree, Wisconsin, before deciding that God wanted him to bring his flock to Beaver Island. James J. Strang appointed by Joseph Smith Jr. presided over the  Church of Jesus Christ of Latter Day Saints (Strangite) from 1844 to 1856.

Schuler
Schuler, Alberta, honors missionary sister Schuler?

Smithfield
Smithfield, Utah, in Cache County, named for John Glover Smith, the first LDS bishop of its area

Snowflake
 Snowflake, Arizona is a portmanteau of the surnames of Erastus Snow (member of the Quorum of the Twelve) and William Jordan Flake, Mormon pioneers and colonizers.

Snowville
Snowville, Utah, in Box Elder County, named for 5th church President Lorenzo Snow."

Talmage
Talmage, Utah, named after Mormon apostle James E. Talmage

Taylor
Taylorsville, Utah, named for LDS church president John Taylor, who was an early resident in the area.
 Taylorville, Alberta also named for the same person
 Taylor, Arizona

Thompson
Thompson-Hansen House, honors intrepid missionary Thompson

Veyo
Veyo, Utah, named for "Virtue", "Enterprise", "Youth", and "Order", values of its Mormon settlers.

Voree
 Voree, Wisconsin, the headquarters of the Church of Jesus Christ of Latter Day Saints (Strangite), a denomination of the Latter Day Saint (Mormon) movement. According to James Strang, founder of the Strangite church in rivalry to Brigham Young, and of the town, the name means "Garden of Peace". The community is situated along former Wisconsin Highway 11 just west of the Racine County line.

Webb

Wellsville
Wellsville, Utah, in Cache County, is named for Daniel H. Wells, a Mormon apostle and an early mayor of Salt Lake City

Widstoe
Widtsoe, Utah, named for early Mormon leader John A. Widtsoe

Wilford
 Wilford, Arizona named for Wilford Woodruff, church president.

Willard
Willard, Utah, in Box Elder County, settled in 1851 as "Willow Creek", later renamed to honor apostle Willard Richards (1804–1854).

Winter Quarters
 Winter Quarters (North Omaha, Nebraska), is named after the winter campgrounds of Mormon pioneers and now is home to Winter Quarters Nebraska Temple

Woodruff
Generally after Wilford Woodruff, president of the church.
Woodruff, Arizona
Woodruff, Idaho
Woodruff, Utah, in Rich County, named for LDS Church president Wilford Woodruff, who often came through on way to visit relatives nearby.

Notes

References

Further reading
John W. Van Cott Utah Place Names. University of Utah Press, editions in 1990 and 2000.

Toponymy
Latter Day Saint movement lists